José Zampicchiatti (11 October 1900 – 13 December 1984) was an Argentine cyclist. He competed in two events at the 1924 Summer Olympics.

References

External links
 

1900 births
1984 deaths
Argentine male cyclists
Olympic cyclists of Argentina
Cyclists at the 1924 Summer Olympics
Sportspeople from Buenos Aires Province